The 2022 MBC Entertainment Awards (Korean: 2022 MBC 방송연예대상) presented by Munhwa Broadcasting Corporation (MBC), took place on December 29, 2022, at MBC Public Hall in Sangam-dong, Mapo-gu, Seoul. It was  hosted by Jun Hyun-moo, Lee Yi-kyung and Kang Min-kyung, and aired on December 29, 2022, at 20.45 (KST).

The Grand Prize was awarded to Jun Hyun-moo and I Live Alone became the Entertainment Program of the Year.

Nominations and winners

Performances 
 Ive
 Lee Mi-joo and Lee Yi-kyung  
 WSG Wannabe (Gaya G)

Presenters

See also 
 2022 KBS Entertainment Awards
 2022 SBS Entertainment Awards

References

External links 

MBC TV original programming
MBC Entertainment Awards
2022 television awards
2022 in South Korea
2022 in South Korean television